Akoranga busway station is in Northcote, New Zealand, on the Northern Busway. It is adjacent to Auckland University of Technology's North Campus and linked to it by a footbridge over the Northern Motorway. It has shelters, electronic real-time information, and passenger drop off and pick up.

It opened on 2 February 2008, the closest busway station to Britomart Transport Centre and the Auckland Harbour Bridge.

It is the southernmost station on the busway. The next station northbound is Smales Farm busway station.

Buses travelling via the station include double-decker buses serving the Northern Express NX1 and NX2 routes.

Services
As of 20 February 2020, the following bus routes serve Akoranga station: NX1, NX2, 866, 923, 926, 942, 801, 814, 843.

The SkyBus North Harbour Express service operating between both terminals at Auckland Airport and the Westfield Albany mall via the busway also stops here.

The Mahu City Express service operating between Snells Beach, Warkworth and Auckland City also stops here.

Gallery

References

Northern Busway, Auckland
Bus stations in New Zealand
Transport buildings and structures in the Auckland Region